René Hournon (7 February 1905 – 16 May 1979) was a French cyclist. He competed in the team pursuit at the 1924 Summer Olympics.

References

External links
 

1905 births
1979 deaths
French male cyclists
Olympic cyclists of France
Cyclists at the 1924 Summer Olympics
Place of birth missing